Edwin Willis Morgan (November 19, 1914 – June 27, 1982), nicknamed "Pepper", was a backup right fielder/first baseman who played in Major League Baseball (MLB) between 1936 and 1937.

Morgan graduated from Lakewood (Ohio) High School in 1931 and is in the LHS Athletic Hall of Fame. Morgan reached the majors in 1936 with the St. Louis Cardinals, spending one year for them before moving to the Brooklyn Dodgers in 1937. On April 14, 1936, Morgan hit a pinch-hit home run on the very first pitch he faced in his first career at bat (becoming the first pinch hitter ever to do so), but he saw little action after that, going 5 for 18 in eight appearances. At the end of the season, he was sent by St. Louis to Brooklyn in the same transaction that brought George Earnshaw to the Cardinals.

In parts of two seasons, Morgan hit .212 (14 for 66) with one home run and five runs batted in in 39 games, including eight runs scored and three doubles.

Morgan died in Lakewood, Ohio at the age of 67.

See also
 List of Major League Baseball players with a home run in their first major league at bat
 Players who hit a pinch-hit home run in his first ever Major League at-bat

External links

 Retrosheet

1914 births
1982 deaths
Brooklyn Dodgers players
St. Louis Cardinals players
Major League Baseball first basemen
Major League Baseball right fielders
Baseball players from Ohio
People from Portage County, Ohio
Miami RedHawks baseball players
Greensburg Trojans players
Bloomington Bloomers players
Columbus Red Birds players
Louisville Colonels (minor league) players
Milwaukee Brewers (minor league) players
Toronto Maple Leafs (International League) players
Montreal Royals players
Indianapolis Indians players
Mount Airy Graniteers players
Galax Leafs players
Martinsville A's players
Youngstown A's players
Welch Miners players
Minor league baseball managers